Dinesh Prasad Singh is an Indian politician from Janata Dal (United). He is the member of the Bihar Legislative Council from Muzaffarpur. His wife Veena Devi is a Member of Parliament from Vaishali lokasabha constituency of Bihar.

Early life 
Dinesh Singh was born in Daudpur  and studied in Kutahi High school.

Political career
Singh started his political career in the 1990s. He has served in the Bihar Legislative Council as the chairman as well as member for 18 years. His wife Veena Devi is Member of Parliament from Vaishali. She has also served as MLA of Gaighat Bihar, Chairperson of Muzaffarpur, and Vice Chairperson of Muzaffarpur.

He was close to Anand Mohan Singh in 1995 with Bihar People's Party then and stood 3rd from Sahebganj, Muzaffarpur (Vidhan Sabha constituency), he shifted to Lalu Prasad Yadav, Rashtriya Janata Dal and now he is presently in Janata Dal (United) with Nitish Kumar. He won with a record breaking margin, with 90.9% votes under his name. He got 5454 votes and his opponent from BJP got just 368 votes out of the total 6000 votes. He has for the past 4 times secured his seat by winning with maximum number of margins across India and has been doing it from past 2 decades. His daughter in law is currently the vice Chairperson of Muzaffarpur.

See also 
Caste politics in India

References 

Janata Dal (United) politicians
1959 births
Living people
Bihari politicians
People from Saran district
Members of the Bihar Legislative Council
Bihar People's Party politicians
Rashtriya Janata Dal politicians